Amalie Auguste (13 November 1801, in Munich – 8 November 1877, in Dresden) was a Bavarian princess by birth and Queen of Saxony by marriage to King John of Saxony.

Biography
Amalie was the fourth child of King Maximilian I Joseph of Bavaria and his second wife Caroline of Baden. She was the identical twin sister of Elisabeth Louise, later Queen of Prussia as wife of Frederick William IV of Prussia. Three other sisters married King Frederick Augustus II of Saxony, Archduke Franz Karl of Austria and Maximilian Joseph, Duke in Bavaria.

In 1851 Amalie Auguste became chairwoman of Women's Association of Dresden (Frauenverein zu Dresden), an organisation founded by her sister, the then queen. Three years later, her husband inherited the throne and she became queen. In 1859 she reorganized the association as the Zentralausschuß obererzgebirgischen und der vogtländischen Frauenvereine and established a legal basis for it, under which the organisation continued until 1932.

Marriage and issue
Amalie Auguste married on  21 November 1822 Prince John of Saxony, who reigned as King of Saxony between 1854 and 1873. John and Amelia had nine children, of whom six died at young ages and predeceased her:

Marie Auguste Friederike (1827–1857), died of tuberculosis
Albert (1828–1902). Married Princess Carola, daughter of Crown Prince Gustav of Sweden
Maria Elisabeth (1830–1912). Married first Ferdinando, Prince of Savoy and Sardinia, and second Niccolò, Marchese Rapallo.
Friedrich August Ernst (1831–1847), died in childhood 
George (1832–1904). Married Infanta Maria Anna of Portugal
Maria Sidonia (1834–1862), died of fever
Anna (1836–1859). Married Ferdinand IV, Grand Duke of Tuscany and died from childbirth. 
Margaretha (1840–1858). Married her cousin Archduke Karl Ludwig of Austria, and died from typhoid fever. 
Sophie (1845–1867). Married her cousin Karl-Theodor, Duke in Bavaria (brother of Empress Elisabeth of Austria), died from influenza.

Ancestry

Sources

 Petermann, Karl: Der König Johann und die Königin Amalie von Sachsen, sowie die Feier ihres goldenen Ehejubiläums; in: Erzählungen. O.Author, o.J.

|-

1801 births
1877 deaths
People from Munich
Crown Princesses of Saxony
House of Wittelsbach
German queens consort
Bavarian princesses
Saxon princesses
Dames of the Order of Saint Isabel
German twins
Burials at Dresden Cathedral
German Roman Catholics
⚭Amalie Auguste of Bavaria
Daughters of kings
Queen mothers